The 17th Annual British Academy Television Craft Awards were presented by the British Academy of Film and Television Arts (BAFTA) on 24 April 2016, with Stephen Mangan hosting the event for the fourth year in a row. The awards were held at The Brewery, City of London, and given in recognition of technical achievements in British television of 2015.

Winners and nominees
Winners are listed first and highlighted in boldface; the nominees are listed below.

Special Award
 Nina Gold

See also
2016 British Academy Television Awards

References

External links
British Academy Craft Awards official website

British Academy Television Craft Awards 
British Academy Television Craft Awards 
British Academy Television Craft Awards 
British Academy Television Craft Awards 
British Academy Television Craft Awards